Rajendra Mushahary is an All India Trinamool Congress politician from Assam. He was elected in Assam Legislative Assembly election in 1985 and 1991 from Gossaigaon constituency.

References 

Living people
Asom Gana Parishad politicians
Members of the Assam Legislative Assembly
People from Kokrajhar district
Year of birth missing (living people)